Mohamed Al-Fayed (born 27 January 1929) is an Egyptian-born businessman whose residence and chief business interests have been in the United Kingdom since the late 1960s. His business interests include ownership of Hôtel Ritz Paris and formerly Harrods department store and Fulham F.C., both in London. In November 2022, Fayed's wealth was estimated at US$1.9 billion, ranking his wealth at no. 1,512 in the world.

Fayed was married to Samira Khashoggi from 1954 to 1956, and had a son Dodi. Dodi was in a romantic relationship with Diana, Princess of Wales, when they both died in a car crash in Paris in 1997. In 1985, Fayed married Finnish socialite and former model Heini Wathén with whom he has four children: Jasmine, Karim, Camilla, and Omar.

Early life
Fayed was born in Roshdy, Alexandria, Egypt, the eldest son of an Egyptian primary school teacher from Asyut. His year of birth has been disputed. His website, alfayed.com, used to claim he was born in 1933, but the Department of Trade found his year of birth was 1929. The website was changed from "1933" to "1929" in 2011. His brothers Ali and Salah have been his business colleagues.

Fayed was married from 1954 to 1956 to Samira Khashoggi. He worked with his wife's brother, Saudi Arabian arms dealer and businessman Adnan Khashoggi.

Sometime in the early 1970s, he began using "Al-Fayed" rather than "Fayed". His brothers Ali and Salah followed suit at the time of their acquisition of the House of Fraser in the 1980s, though by the late 1980s, both had reverted to calling themselves simply "Fayed". Some have assumed that Fayed's addition of "Al-" to his name was to imply aristocratic origins, like "de" in French or "von" in German, though Al- does not have the same social connotations in Arabic. This assumption led to Private Eye magazine nicknaming him the "Phoney Pharaoh".

United Kingdom

Early business dealings

Fayed and his brothers founded a shipping company in Egypt before moving its headquarters to Genoa, Italy with offices in London.

Around 1964 he entered a close relationship with Haitian leader François Duvalier, known as 'Papa Doc', and became interested in the construction of a Fayed-Duvalier oil refinery in Haiti. He also associated with the geologist George de Mohrenschildt. Fayed terminated his stay in Haiti six months later when a sample of "crude oil" provided by Haitian associates proved to be low-grade molasses.

Fayed then moved to England, where he lived in central London. In the mid-1960s, he met the ruler of Dubai, Sheikh Rashid Bin Saeed Al Maktoum, who entrusted him with helping transform Dubai, where he set up IMS (International Marine Services) in 1968. Fayed introduced British companies like the Costain Group (of which he became a director and 30% shareholder), Bernard Sunley & Sons and Taylor Woodrow to the emirate to carry out the required construction work. He also became a financial adviser to the then Sultan of Brunei Omar Ali Saifuddien III in 1966.

Fayed briefly joined the board of the mining conglomerate Lonrho in 1975 but left after a disagreement.

In 1979, he bought The Ritz hotel in Paris, France for US$30 million.

In 1984, Fayed and his brothers purchased a 30% stake in House of Fraser, a group that included the London store Harrods, from Roland 'Tiny' Rowland, the head of Lonrho. In 1985, he and his brothers bought the remaining 70% of House of Fraser for £615m. Rowland claimed that the Fayed brothers lied about their background and wealth and he put pressure on the government to investigate them. A Department of Trade and Industry (DTI) inquiry into the Fayeds was launched. The DTI's subsequent report was critical, but no action was taken against the Fayeds, and while many believed the contents of the report, others felt it was politically motivated. Rowland described his relationship with the Fayed family in his book A Hero from Zero. He started with the following words:

In Spring 1985, the three Fayed brothers acquired House of Fraser. They did so despite detailed allegations by Lonrho as to their unsavoury character and the fabrications as to their origins and wealth which they had invented to present themselves in a falsely favourable light.

The rest of the book set out to justify these statements.

In 1998, Rowland accused Fayed of stealing papers and jewels from his Harrods safe deposit box. Fayed was arrested, but the charges were dropped. Rowland died in 1998. Fayed settled the dispute with a payment to his widow; he also sued the Metropolitan Police for false arrest in 2002, but lost the case.

In 1994, House of Fraser went public, but Fayed retained the private ownership of Harrods.

He re-launched the humorous magazine Punch in 1996 but it folded again in 2002.

Al-Fayed unsuccessfully applied for British citizenship twice, in 1994 and 1999. It was suggested that his feud with Rowland contributed to the first refusal.

Cash-for-questions
In 1994, in what became known as the cash-for-questions affair, Fayed revealed the names of MPs he had paid to ask questions in Parliament on his behalf, but who had failed to declare their fees. It saw Conservative MPs Neil Hamilton and Tim Smith leave the government in disgrace, and a Committee on Standards in Public Life established to prevent such corruption occurring again. Fayed also revealed that cabinet minister Jonathan Aitken stayed for free at the Ritz Hotel in Paris at the same time as a group of Saudi arms dealers, leading to Aitken's subsequent unsuccessful libel case and imprisonment for perjury. During this period in 1988, Al-Fayed's spokesman was Michael Cole, a former BBC journalist, although Cole's PR work for Al-Fayed did not cease in 1998.

Hamilton lost a subsequent libel action against Al-Fayed in December 1999 and a subsequent appeal against the verdict in December 2000. The former MP has always denied that he was paid by Al-Fayed for asking questions in Parliament. Hamilton's libel action related to a Channel 4 Dispatches documentary broadcast on 16 January 1997 in which Al-Fayed made claims that the MP had received up to £110,000 in cash and other gratuities for asking parliamentary questions. Hamilton's basis for his appeal was that the original verdict was invalid because Al-Fayed had paid £10,000 for documents stolen from the dustbins of Hamilton's legal representatives by Benjamin Pell.

In 2003, Fayed moved from Surrey, UK to Switzerland, alleging a breach in an agreement with the British tax authority. In 2005, he moved back to Britain, saying that he "regards Britain as home". He moored a yacht called the Sokar in Monaco prior to selling it in 2014.

Sale of Harrods
After denials that Harrods was for sale, it was sold to Qatar Holdings, the sovereign wealth fund of the country of Qatar, on 10 May 2010. A fortnight previously, Fayed had stated that "People approach us from Kuwait, Saudi Arabia, Qatar. Fair enough. But I put two fingers up to them. It is not for sale. This is not Marks and Spencer or Sainsbury's. It is a special place that gives people pleasure. There is only one Mecca."

Harrods was sold for £1.5 billion. Fayed later revealed in an interview that he decided to sell Harrods following the difficulty in getting his dividend approved by the trustee of the Harrods pension fund. Fayed said "I'm here every day, I can't take my profit because I have to take a permission of those bloody idiots. I say is this right? Is this logic? Somebody like me? I run a business and I need to take bloody fucking trustee's permission to take my profit". Fayed was appointed honorary chairman of Harrods, a position he was scheduled to hold for at least six months.

Scotland real estate
In 1972, Fayed purchased the Balnagown estate in Easter Ross, Northern Scotland. From an initial 4.8 hectares (12 acres), Al-Fayed has since built the estate up to 26,300 hectares (65,000 acres). Al-Fayed invested more than £20 million in the estate, restored the 14th-century pink Balnagown Castle, and created a tourist accommodation business. The Highlands of Scotland tourist board awarded Al-Fayed the Freedom of the Highlands in 2002, in recognition of his "outstanding contribution and commitment to the Highlands."

As an Egyptian with links to Scotland, Al-Fayed was intrigued enough to fund a 2008 reprint of the 15th-century chronicle Scotichronicon by Walter Bower. The Scotichronicon describes how Scota, a sister of the Egyptian Pharaoh, fled her family and landed in Scotland, bringing with her the Stone of Scone. According to the chronicle, Scotland was later named in her honour. The tale is disputed by modern historians. Al-Fayed later declared that "The Scots are originally Egyptians and that's the truth."

In 2009, Al-Fayed revealed that he was a supporter of Scottish independence from the United Kingdom, announcing to the Scots that "It's time for you to waken up and detach yourselves from the English and their terrible politicians...whatever help is needed for Scotland to regain its independence, I will provide it...when you Scots regain your freedom, I am ready to be your president."

Charity
Fayed set up the Al Fayed Charitable Foundation in 1987 aiming to help children with life-limiting conditions and children living in poverty. The charity works mainly with charities and hospices for disabled and neglected children in the UK, Thailand and Mongolia.

Some of the charities with which it works include Francis House Hospice in Manchester, Great Ormond Street Hospital and ChildLine. In 1998, Al-Fayed bought Princess Diana's old boarding school in Kent and helped found the New School at West Heath for children with additional needs and mental health problems.

In 2011, Mohamed Al-Fayed's daughter Camilla, who has worked as an ambassador for the charity for eight years, opened the newly refurbished Zoe’s Place baby hospice in West Derby, Liverpool.

Fulham F.C.

Al-Fayed bought west London professional football club Fulham F.C. for £6.25 million in 1997. The purchase was made via Bill Muddyman's Muddyman Group. His long-term aim was that Fulham would become a Premier League side within five years. In 2001, Fulham won the First Division (now Football League Championship) under manager Jean Tigana, winning 101 points and scoring 90 goals in the 2000/2001 season. This meant that Al-Fayed had achieved his Premier League aim a year ahead of schedule. By 2002, Fulham were competing in European football, winning the Intertoto Cup and challenging in the UEFA Cup. Fulham reached the final of the 2009–10 UEFA Europa League and continued to play in the Premier League throughout Al-Fayed's tenure as owner, which ended in 2013.

Fulham temporarily left Craven Cottage while it was being upgraded to meet modern safety standards. There were fears that the club would not return to the Cottage after it was revealed that Al-Fayed had sold the first right to build on the ground to a property development firm.

Fulham lost a legal case against former manager Tigana in 2004 after Al-Fayed had wrongly alleged that Tigana had overpaid more than £7m for new players and had negotiated transfers in secret. In 2009, Al-Fayed said that he was in favour of a wage cap for footballers, and criticised the management of The Football Association and Premier League as "run by donkeys who don't understand business, who are dazzled by money."

A statue of the American entertainer Michael Jackson was unveiled by Al-Fayed in April 2011 at Craven Cottage. In 1999 Jackson had attended a league game against Wigan Athletic at the stadium. Following criticism of the statue, Al-Fayed said "If some stupid fans don't understand and appreciate such a gift this guy gave to the world they can go to hell. I don't want them to be fans." The statue was taken down by the club's new owners in 2013; Al-Fayed blamed the club's subsequent relegation from the Premier League on the 'bad luck' brought by its removal. Al-Fayed then donated the statue to the National Football Museum. In March 2019, the statue was removed from the museum due to the backlash against Jackson caused by the child-abuse accusations against him in the documentary Leaving Neverland.

Under Al-Fayed Fulham F.C. was owned by Mafco Holdings, based in the tax haven of Bermuda and in turn owned by Al-Fayed and his family. By 2011, Al-Fayed had lent Fulham F.C. £187 million in interest free loans. In July 2013, it was announced that Al-Fayed had sold the club to Pakistani American businessman Shahid Khan, who owns the NFL's Jacksonville Jaguars.

Business interests

Al-Fayed's business interests include:

 Hôtel Ritz Paris
 Balnagowan Castle & Estates, Scottish Highlands
 HJW Geospatial
 Turnbull & Asser
 75 Rockefeller Plaza, New York City – built in 1947, originally the Esso Building, later the Time Warner Building; owned by Al-Fayed and managed and leased by RXR Realty

Al-Fayed's major business purchases have included:

 Ritz Hotel Paris (1979)
 House of Fraser Group, including Harrods (1985, £615 million; sold 2010, £1.5 billion)
 Fulham Football Club (1997, £30 million; sold 2013)
 After the death of Wallis Simpson, Fayed took over the lease of the Villa Windsor in Paris, the former home of the Duchess of Windsor and her husband, the Duke of Windsor, previously Edward VIII. Together with his valet Sydney Johnson, who had also been valet to the Duke, he organised the restoration of the villa and its collections.

Death of Dodi Fayed

Background and relationship with Diana
Lady Diana Spencer was born in 1961, and married the heir to the British throne, Charles, Prince of Wales (now King Charles III), in 1981, becoming Princess of Wales. Diana was an international celebrity and a frequent visitor to Harrods in the 1980s. Al-Fayed and Dodi first met Diana and Charles in July 1986 when they were introduced at a polo tournament sponsored by Harrods.

Diana and Charles divorced in 1996, after what was mostly a tumultuous marriage. Diana was hosted by Al-Fayed in the south of France in mid-1997, with her sons, Princes William and Harry. For the holiday, Fayed bought a 195 ft yacht, the Jonikal (later renamed the Sokar). Dodi and Diana later began a private cruise on the Jonikal and paparazzi photographs of the couple in an embrace were published. Diana's friend, the journalist Richard Kay, confirmed that Diana was involved in "her first serious romance" since her divorce.

Dodi and Diana went on a second private cruise on the Jonikal in the third week of August, and returned from Sardinia to Paris on 30 August. Later that day, the couple privately dined at the Ritz, after the behaviour of the press caused them to cancel a restaurant reservation. They planned to spend the night at Dodi's apartment near the Arc de Triomphe. In an attempt to deceive the paparazzi, a decoy car left the front of the hotel, while Diana and Dodi departed from the rear of the hotel in a Mercedes-Benz S280 driven by concierge Henri Paul. Five minutes later, the car crashed in the Pont de l'Alma tunnel. Dodi and Paul were found dead at this location. Diana died afterwards in hospital. British bodyguard Trevor Rees-Jones, who sustained a serious head injury, was the sole survivor of the crash, though conscious after the car crashed. Fayed arrived in Paris a day later and viewed Dodi's body, which was finally returned to the United Kingdom for an Islamic funeral.

Conspiracy theories
From February 1998, Al-Fayed maintained that the crash was a result of a conspiracy, and later contended that the crash was orchestrated by MI6 on the instructions of Prince Philip, Duke of Edinburgh. His claims were dismissed by a French judicial investigation, but Fayed appealed the verdict. A libel action was brought against Al-Fayed by Neil Hamilton (see above).

The British Operation Paget, a Metropolitan police inquiry that concluded in 2006, also found no evidence of a conspiracy. To Operation Paget, Al-Fayed made 175 "conspiracy claims".

An inquest headed by Lord Justice Scott Baker into the deaths of Diana and Dodi began at the Royal Courts of Justice, London, on 2 October 2007 and lasted for six months. It was a continuation of the original inquest that had begun in 2004.

At the Scott Baker inquest, Fayed accused the Duke of Edinburgh, the Prince of Wales, Lady Sarah McCorquodale, her sister, and numerous others, of plotting to kill the Princess of Wales. Their motive, he claimed, was that they could not tolerate the idea of the Princess marrying a Muslim.

Al-Fayed first claimed that the Princess was pregnant to the Daily Express in May 2001, and that he was the only person who had been told. Witnesses at the inquest who said the Princess was not pregnant, and could not have been, were part of the conspiracy according to Al-Fayed. Fayed's testimony at the inquest was roundly condemned in the press as farcical. Members of the British Government's Intelligence and Security Committee accused Fayed of turning the inquest into a 'circus' and called for it to be ended prematurely. Lawyers representing Al-Fayed later accepted at the inquest that there was no direct evidence that either the Duke of Edinburgh nor MI6 was involved in any murder conspiracy involving Diana or Dodi. A few days before Al-Fayed's appearance, John Macnamara, a former senior detective at Scotland Yard and Al-Fayed's investigator for five years from 1997, was forced to admit on 14 February 2008 that he had no evidence to suggest foul play, except for the assertions Al-Fayed had made to him. His admissions also related to the lack of evidence for Al-Fayed's claims of the Princess's pregnancy and the couple's engagement.

The jury verdict, given on 7 April 2008, was that Diana and Dodi were "unlawfully killed" through the grossly negligent driving of Henri Paul, who was intoxicated, and the pursuing vehicles.

Al-Fayed's lawyers also accepted that there was no evidence to support the assertion that Diana was illegally embalmed to conceal pregnancy, or that a pregnancy could be confirmed by any medical evidence. They also accepted that there was no evidence to support the assertion that the French emergency and medical services had played any role in a conspiracy to harm Diana. Following the Baker inquest, Al-Fayed said that he was abandoning his conspiracy campaign, and would accept the jury's verdict.

Journalist Dominic Lawson wrote in The Independent in 2008 that Al-Fayed sought to concoct "a conspiracy to cover up the true circumstances" of fatalities caused by the crash "involving an intoxicated and over-excited driver (an employee of Mohamed Fayed's Paris Ritz)". He "had remarkable success in persuading elements of the tabloid press, notably the Daily Express, to give the conspiracy a fair wind."

Al-Fayed financially supported Unlawful Killing (2011), a documentary film presenting his version of events. It was not formally released because of the potential for libel suits.

Sexual harassment allegations
Al-Fayed has been accused by multiple women of sexual harassment and assault.

Young women applying for employment at Harrods were often submitted to HIV tests and gynaecological examinations. They were then selected to spend the weekend with Al-Fayed in Paris. In her profile of Al-Fayed for Vanity Fair, Maureen Orth described how, according to former employees, "Fayed regularly walked the store on the lookout for young, attractive women to work in his office. Those who rebuffed him would often be subjected to crude, humiliating comments about their appearance or dress... A dozen ex-employees I spoke with said that
Fayed would chase secretaries around the office and sometimes try to stuff money down women's blouses".

In December 1997, the ITV current affairs programme The Big Story broadcast testimonies from a number of former Harrods employees who spoke of how Al-Fayed routinely sexually harassed women in similar ways.

Al-Fayed was interviewed under caution by the Metropolitan Police after an allegation of sexual assault against a 15-year-old schoolgirl in October 2008. The case was dropped by the Crown Prosecution Service when they found there was no realistic chance of conviction due to conflicting statements.

A December 2017 episode of Channel 4's Dispatches programme alleged that Al-Fayed sexually harassed three Harrods employees, and attempted to "groom" them. One of the women was 17 at the time. Cheska Hill-Wood waived her right to anonymity to be interviewed for the programme. The programme alleged Al-Fayed targeted young employees over a 13-year period.

References

Bibliography

External links

  (archived on Wayback Machine in 2014)
 Al-Fayed Charitable Foundation

1929 births
Living people
20th-century Egyptian businesspeople
Egyptian billionaires
Egyptian conspiracy theorists
Egyptian emigrants to England
Egyptian emigrants to Switzerland
Egyptian expatriates in Monaco
Egyptian football chairmen and investors
El Fayed family
Fulham F.C. directors and chairmen
Harrods
Hoteliers
House of Fraser
People from Alexandria